Punctum randolphi is a species of minute air-breathing land snail, a terrestrial pulmonate gastropod mollusk in the family Punctidae, the dot snails.

Shell description
The diameter of the shell of Punctum randolphi is between 1.25 and 1.4 mm wide.  The exterior surface has a very faint sculpture of radial striae.  The aperture of Punctum randolphi is wide and somewhat oblique.  The umbilicus is small and deep.

Distribution
Punctum randolphi is found in North America, in British Columbia, Washington, Oregon, and Idaho.

References

Punctidae
Gastropods described in 1895